Little Falls may refer to:

Places in the United States
 Little Falls, Maine
 Little Falls, Minnesota
 Little Falls, New Jersey
 Little Falls (NJT station)
 Little Falls (city), New York 
 Little Falls (town), New York
 Little Falls (Potomac River), a set of rapids downstream of Great Falls near Washington, DC
Little Falls Branch (Potomac River)
Little Falls Park, Montgomery County, Maryland
Little Falls Parkway, Montgomery County, Maryland
 Little Falls, Wisconsin, a town
 Little Falls, Polk County, Wisconsin, an unincorporated community
 Vader, Washington, formerly Little Falls
 Little Falls, Virginia
 Little Falls, West Virginia
 Little Falls Dam, across the Mississippi River near Little Falls, Minnesota
 Little Falls Meetinghouse, a Friends meetinghouse in Fallston, Maryland

Places in Canada
 Little Falls (Hamilton, Ontario), a waterfall
 Little Falls, a community in Ramara, Ontario

Places in South Africa
 Little Falls, a community in Johannesburg

See also
 Little Falls Township, Morrison County, Minnesota
 Little Falls Mets, a defunct minor-league baseball team in Little Falls, New York